Cincinnati Creek is a river in Oneida County in the state of New York. It begins southwest of the hamlet of Alder Creek, and flows into the West Canada Creek in Mapledale.

Hydrology
The United States Geological Survey (USGS) formally maintained two stream gauges along Cincinnati Creek. One in operation from 1969 to 1970, was located in Remsen. The other was in operation from 1968 to 1970, and was located at Barneveld.

Flooding
In late June 2010, heavy rain caused major flooding in Remsen. Around six homes and the village library were surrounded by water, which flowed like a river down the streets and sidewalks.

Recreation

References 

Rivers of New York (state)